The American Society of Colon and Rectal Surgeons (ASCRS), formerly the  American Proctologic Society, is a professional society for surgeons specializing in colorectal surgery. It is one of the oldest surgical societies, having been established in 1899.

History
The organization was established as the American Proctologic Society in 1899, at a meeting held in Columbus, Ohio:

The name of the organization was changed to American Society of Colon and Rectal Surgeons in 1973 "to indicate more clearly the scope of its specialty".

Activities
The ASCRS has described its activities as follows:

The ASCRS offers continuing medical education courses. For this provision, it is accredited by the Accreditation Council for Continuing Medical Education.

The ASCRS holds an annual conference "to provide participants with in-depth and up-to-date knowledge relative to surgery for diseases of the colon, rectum, and anus", with an emphasis on patient care, teaching, and research. The ASCRS is a participant in the American Joint Committee on Cancer. In 2016, the American College of Surgeons reported on its partnership with the ASCRS in developing technical skill assessments in the colorectal surgery field.

The ASCRS was one of the contributors in the formation of the National Accreditation Program for Rectal Cancer.

Past Presidents 
The following list of surgeons have served as President of the ASCRS:

References

Further reading
American Society of Colon and Rectal Surgeons

Medical associations based in the United States
Scientific organizations established in 1899